Anthony or Tony Ortega may refer to:

 Anthony Ortega (baseball), Venezuelan baseball pitcher
 Anthony Ortega (musician), American jazz musician
 Tony Ortega, American journalist and blogger